Éguzon-Chantôme (Limousin: Aguson e Chantòsma) is a commune in the Indre department in central France.

It is situated on the river Creuse. A nearby hydroelectric dam (the Éguzon Dam), opened in 1923, provides electricity and also creates a lake (Lac de Chambon) that is used for leisure and watersports.

Geography
The river Abloux forms all of the commune's western border and the Creuse, with the Chambon Lake, forms all of its eastern border.

Population

See also
Communes of the Indre department

References

Communes of Indre
County of La Marche